"That's the Thing About Love" is a song written by Richard Leigh and Gary Nicholson, and recorded by American country music artist Don Williams.  It was released in March 1984 as the first single from the album Cafe Carolina.  The song was Williams' sixteenth number one on the country chart.  The single stayed at number one for a week and spent a total of thirteen weeks on the chart.

Charts

Weekly charts

Year-end charts

References
 

1984 singles
Don Williams songs
Songs written by Richard Leigh (songwriter)
MCA Records singles
Songs written by Gary Nicholson
1984 songs